The Americas Zone will be one of the three regional zones of the 2019 Davis Cup.

Participating nations
<onlyinclude>

Seeds: 

Remaining nations:

Results summary

Results

El Salvador vs. Peru

Paraguay vs. Mexico

Guatemala vs. Bolivia

References

External links
Official Website

Americas Zone Group II
Davis Cup Americas Zone
Davis Cup Americas Zone Group II
Davis Cup Americas Zone Group II
Davis Cup Americas Zone Group II